Elm Township, Nebraska may refer to the following places:

 Elm Township, Antelope County, Nebraska
 Elm Township, Gage County, Nebraska

See also 
 Elm Creek Township, Buffalo County, Nebraska
 Elm Township (disambiguation)

Nebraska township disambiguation pages